This is a list of episodes for the seventh season (1981–82) of the NBC television series Quincy, M.E..

The opening theme is once again rearranged to sound similar to Season 5's opening, and the role is now shown with the regular cast credits (e.g., Garry Walberg as Lt. Monahan and John S. Ragin as Astin)

Episodes

References

External links
 

1981 American television seasons
1982 American television seasons